Marsel Idiatullin (born 28 December 1977), is  a retired Uzbek professional footballer and coach at Lokomotiv Tashkent Academy.

Career

Qizilqum Zarafshon
In 2002-2003, Idiatullin played for Qizilqum Zarafshon. Qizilqum finished the 2002 season in third place and Idiatullin scored 21 goals for the club. In the 2003 season he became top scorer of Uzbek League, scoring 26 goals.

Lokomotiv Tashkent
He joined Lokomotiv Tashkent in 2004 and played 5 seasons for the club. He is currently the player with most caps and all-time top scorer of Lokomotiv with 42 goals.

He is member of the Gennadi Krasnitsky club of Uzbek top scorers with 101 goals (89 in Uzbek League and 12 in Cup matches).

Sogdiana Jizzakh
In August 2009 he left Lokomotiv Tashkent and moved to Sogdiana Jizzakh.

Durmon-Sport
During the 2010 season he played for Durmon-Sport in First League.

Honours

Club

 Uzbek League 3rd: 2002

Individual
 Uzbek League Top Scorer: 2003

References

External links

1977 births
Living people
Uzbekistani footballers
Association football forwards
PFC Lokomotiv Tashkent players
FC Qizilqum Zarafshon players